Barrie Blizzard were a Canadian professional indoor lacrosse team that played in the Canadian Lacrosse League.  The team is played its home games at the Barrie Molson Centre.

History 

In December, 2014, eleven new players were added to the Blizzard roster.
in 2015, the Blizzard won the Canadian Lacrosse League's Creator's Cup. The team's head coach was Brad MacArthur.

Season-by-season record 

''Note: GP = Games played, W = Wins, L = Losses, T = Ties, OTL = Overtime losses, Pts = Points, GF = Goals for, GA = Goals against

References

External links 
 Official Website
 CLax: Canada’s new professional lacrosse league slated for later this year

Canadian Lacrosse League
Lacrosse teams in Ontario
Sport in Barrie